René Fernández Apaza (January 9, 1924 – August 14, 2013) was a Bolivian Prelate of the Catholic Church.

René Fernández Apaza was born in Padilla, Bolivia ordained a priest on November 28, 1948. Fernández was appointed bishop to the Diocese of Oruro on March 2, 1968, and consecrated on April 21, 1968. Fernández was appointed to the Military Bishopric of Bolivia on July 30, 1975, and would resign on May 17, 1986. Fernández was appointed Coadjutor Archbishop of the Archdiocese of Sucre November 21, 1981 and succeeds on November 30, 1983. Fernández' s final appointment came on April 16, 1988, to the Archdiocese of Cochabamba where he would remain until retiring July 8, 1999.

He died of an apparent heart attack on August 14, 2013.

See also
Diocese of Oruro
Military Bishopric of Bolivia
Archdiocese of Sucre
Archdiocese of Cochabamba

References

External links and additional sources
 (for Chronology of Bishops)
 (for Chronology of Bishops)
Catholic-Hierarchy 
Archdiocese of Cochabamba (Spanish)

1924 births
2013 deaths
20th-century Roman Catholic bishops in Bolivia
Bolivian Roman Catholic archbishops
Bolivian Roman Catholic bishops
Roman Catholic archbishops of Cochabamba
Roman Catholic archbishops of Sucre
Roman Catholic bishops of Oruro
Roman Catholic military bishops of Bolivia